The Finland women's national under-20 basketball team is a national basketball team of Finland, administered by the Basketball Finland. It represents the country in women's international under-20 basketball competitions.

FIBA U20 Women's European Championship participations

See also
Finland women's national basketball team
Finland women's national under-19 basketball team

References

External links
Archived records of Finland team participations

Basketball in Finland
Basketball
Women's national under-20 basketball teams